NetDevil Ltd. was an American developer of massively multiplayer online games, based in Louisville, Colorado and owned by Gazillion Entertainment.

History

Beginnings 
NetDevil was founded in 1997 by Scott Brown, Peter Grundy and Steven Williams in Louisville, a suburb north of Denver, Colorado. Before forming NetDevil, Brown, Grundy, and Williams worked at Digital Creators, an information technology firm located in Boulder, Colorado. The three dreamed of being creators of their own digital worlds, and began developing Jumpgate, a space-based flight simulator MMO, during their spare evenings and weekends. After a year of part-time work, they quit their jobs and started NetDevil,  headquartered in the basement of Scott Brown's home. In an interview with GameDaily, Scott Brown shared that at one point they had fourteen people packed into one big room.

According to the company's website, the name NetDevil was chosen because of the "owners' obsession with cool scary things that live in the deep dark waters of the world". All of the company's principals are certified SCUBA divers, including one certified dive master.

New location 
In June 2007, NetDevil announced that they had completed moving into their new location in Louisville, Colorado, a nearly  office facility which includes a professional sound studio, user testing facility and LEGO model shop. To celebrate their 10th anniversary, they hosted a party at their new location.

Acquisition by Gazillion Entertainment 
In July 2008, NetDevil was purchased by game publisher Gazillion Entertainment, though this was not made public until March 2009.

Departures of founders 
In the last months of 2010, all remaining founders of NetDevil, notably Scott Brown, Peter Grundy, and Ryan Seabury, who headed the LEGO Universe team, chose to leave the company. Brown and Seabury started End Games Entertainment, whose first product is a Facebook game titled Vorp!

Layoffs 
In February 2011, two rounds of layoffs took place at the NetDevil studio. The first round eliminated the Jumpgate Evolution development team. The second downsized the LEGO Universe team and appears to be part of a deal in which Gazillion passed control of development of LEGO Universe to the LEGO Group. This was an effect of the slow failure of LEGO Universe.

Products

Released
Jumpgate (2001) – A massively multiplayer online flight simulator set in space. Though it was initially published by 3DO, NetDevil regained control of the game in 2002, due to 3DO's bankruptcy. Jumpgate was shut down on April 30, 2012. Although the player community has expressed interest in acquiring the source code for Jumpgate, Gazillion has, at this time, not made it available.

Auto Assault (2006) – A massively multiplayer online game that combined vehicular combat with role-playing elements, allowing the player to explore a post-apocalyptic future in customizable cars, motorcycles, semis, and tanks. It was published by NCsoft, and shut down in 2007.

Warmonger: Operation Downtown Destruction (2007) – An apocalyptic, first-person shooter (FPS), built around the AGEIA PhysX processor with Unreal Engine 3. It featured a piece-by-piece destruction system and fluid and cloth-based effects.

Lego Universe (2010) – A children's MMO product in which LEGO minifigures join the Nexus Force, to defeat the Maelstrom. LEGO Universe development largely supported NetDevil from 2007 until the studio was closed by Gazillion and control of the product released to LEGO, and shut down in 2012.

In development
Jumpgate Evolution – In June 2007, NetDevil announced plans for Jumpgate Evolution, a remake of NetDevil's first project, the classic MMO Jumpgate. The space-based title was planned to receive a massive graphical revamp, along with many new features. In December 2007, NetDevil announced the launch of a website for Jumpgate Evolution containing backstory written by Keith Baker, in-game footage, screenshots and video, community forums, and a fan site kit available for download. This project was cancelled with the layoff of the development team in February 2011.

References

External links
 Gazillion Entertainment's website
 Interview with Peter Grundy on FileFront.com
 LEGO Universe Website

Video game companies established in 1997
Video game companies disestablished in 2011
Defunct video game companies of the United States
Video game development companies
Companies based in Colorado